Podocarpus is a genus of conifers, the most numerous and widely distributed of the podocarp family, the Podocarpaceae. The name comes from    Greek πούς (poús, “foot”) + καρπός (karpós, “fruit”). The cones have two to five fused cone scales, which form a fleshy, berry-like, brightly coloured receptacle at maturity. The fleshy cones attract birds, which then eat the cones and disperse the seeds in their droppings. About 97 to 107 species are placed in the genus depending on the circumscription of the species.

Species are cultivated as ornamental plants for parks and large gardens. The cultivar 'County Park Fire' has won the Royal Horticultural Society's Award of Garden Merit.

Names and etymology 
Common names for various species include "yellowwood" and "pine", as in the plum pine (Podocarpus elatus) or the Buddhist pine (Podocarpus macrophyllus).

Description 
Podocarpus species are evergreen woody plants. They are generally trees, but may also be shrubs. The trees can reach a height of 40 meters at their tallest. Some shrubby species have a decumbent growth habit. The primary branches form pseudowhorls around the trunk. The bark can be scaly or fibrous and peeling with vertical strips. Terminal buds are distinctive with bud scales that are often imbricate and can be spreading.

The leaves are simple and flattened, and may be sessile or short petiolate. The phyllotaxis or leaf arrangement is spiral, and may be subopposite on some shoots. The leaves are usually linear-lanceolate or linear-elliptic in shape, though they can be broader lanceolate, ovate, or nearly elliptic in some species. Juvenile leaves are often larger than adult leaves, though similar in shape. The leaves are coriaceous and have a distinct midrib. The stomata are usually restricted to the abaxial or underside of the leaf, forming two stomatal bands around the midrib.

Podocarpus spp. are generally dioecious, with the male pollen cones and female seed cones borne on separate individual plants, but some species may be monoecious. The cones develop from axillary buds, and may be solitary or form clusters.

The pollen cones are long and catkin-like in shape. They may be sessile or short pedunculate. A pollen cone consists of a slender rachis with numerous spirally arranged microsporophylls around it. Each triangular microsporophyll has two basal pollen-producing pollen sacs. The pollen is bisaccate.

The seed cones are highly modified with the few cone scales swelling and fusing at maturity. The cones are pedunculate and often solitary. The seed cone consists of two to five cone scales of which only the uppermost one or rarely two nearest the apex of the cone are fertile. Each fertile scale usually has one apical ovule. The infertile basal scales fuse and swell to form a succulent, usually brightly colored receptacle. Each cone generally has only one seed, but may have two or rarely more. The seed is attached to the apex of the receptacle. The seed is entirely covered by a fleshy modified scale known as an epimatium. The epimatium is usually green, but may be bluish or reddish in some species.

Distribution 
The natural distribution of the genus consists of much of Africa, Asia, Australia, Central and South America, and several South Pacific islands. The genus occurs from southern Chile north to Mexico in the Americas and from New Zealand north to Japan in the Asia-Pacific region.

Podocarpus and the Podocarpaceae were endemic to the ancient supercontinent of Gondwana, which broke up into Africa, South America, India, Australia-New Guinea, New Zealand, and New Caledonia between 105 and 45 million years ago. Podocarpus is a characteristic tree of the Antarctic flora, which originated in the cool, moist climate of southern Gondwana, and elements of the flora survive in the humid temperate regions of the former supercontinent. As the continents drifted north and became drier and hotter, podocarps and other members of the Antarctic flora generally retreated to humid regions, especially in Australia, where sclerophyll genera such as Acacia and Eucalyptus became predominant. The flora of Malesia, which includes the Malay peninsula, Indonesia, the Philippines, and New Guinea, is generally derived from Asia, but includes many elements of the old Gondwana flora, including several other genera in the Podocarpaceae (Dacrycarpus, Dacrydium, Falcatifolium, Nageia, Phyllocladus, and the Malesian endemic Sundacarpus), and also Agathis in the Araucariaceae.

Classification

The two subgenera, Podocarpus and Foliolatus, are distinguished by cone and seed morphology.

In Podocarpus, the cone is not subtended by lanceolate bracts, and the seed usually has an apical ridge. Species are distributed in the temperate forests of Tasmania, New Zealand, and southern Chile, with a few occurring in the tropical highlands of Africa and the Americas.

In Foliolatus, the cone is subtended by two lanceolate bracts ("foliola"), and the seed usually lacks an apical ridge. The species are tropical and subtropical, concentrated in eastern and southeastern Asia and Malesia, overlapping with subgenus Podocarpus in northeastern Australia and New Caledonia.

Species in family Podocarpaceae have been reshuffled a number of times based on genetic and physiological evidence, with many species formerly assigned to  Podocarpus now assigned to other genera. A sequence of classification schemes has moved species between  Nageia and Podocarpus, and in 1969, de Laubenfels divided the huge genus Podocarpus into Dacrycarpus, Decussocarpus (an invalid name he later revised to the valid Nageia), Prumnopitys, and Podocarpus.

Some species of genus Afrocarpus were formerly in Podocarpus, such as Afrocarpus gracilior.

Species
 Subgenus Podocarpus
 section Podocarpus (eastern and southern Africa)
 Podocarpus elongatus
 Podocarpus latifolius
 Podocarpus milanjianus
 section Scytopodium (Madagascar, eastern Africa)
 Podocarpus capuronii
 Podocarpus henkelii
 Podocarpus humbertii
 Podocarpus madagascariensis
 Podocarpus rostratus
 section Australis (southeast Australia, New Zealand, New Caledonia, southern Chile) 
 Podocarpus alpinus
 Podocarpus gnidioides
 Podocarpus laetus
 Podocarpus lawrencei
 Podocarpus nivalis
 Podocarpus nubigenus
 Podocarpus totara
 section Crassiformis (northeast Queensland)
 Podocarpus smithii
 section Capitulatis (central Chile, southern Brazil, the Andes from northern Argentina to Ecuador)
 Podocarpus aracensis
 Podocarpus glomeratus
 Podocarpus lambertii
 Podocarpus parlatorei
 Podocarpus salignus
 Podocarpus sellowii
 Podocarpus sprucei
 Podocarpus transiens
section Pratensis (southeast Mexico to Guyana and Peru) 
 Podocarpus oleifolius
 Podocarpus pendulifolius
 Podocarpus tepuiensis
section Lanceolatis (southern Mexico, Puerto Rico, Lesser Antilles, Venezuela to highland Bolivia)
 Podocarpus coriaceus
 Podocarpus matudae
 Podocarpus rusbyi
 Podocarpus salicifolius
 Podocarpus steyermarkii
section Pumilis (southern Caribbean islands and Guiana Highlands)
 Podocarpus angustifolius
 Podocarpus aristulatus
 Podocarpus buchholzii
 Podocarpus roraimae
 Podocarpus urbanii
section Nemoralis (central and northern South America, south to Bolivia)
 Podocarpus brasiliensis
 Podocarpus celatus
 Podocarpus guatemalensis
 Podocarpus magnifolius
 Podocarpus purdieanus
 Podocarpus trinitensis
 Subgenus Foliolatus
 section Foliolatus (Nepal to Sumatra, the Philippines, and New Guinea to Tonga) 
 Podocarpus archboldii
 Podocarpus beecherae
 Podocarpus borneensis
 Podocarpus deflexus
 Podocarpus epiphyticus
 Podocarpus insularis
 Podocarpus levis
 Podocarpus neriifolius
 Podocarpus novae-caledoniae
 Podocarpus pallidus
 Podocarpus rubens
 Podocarpus spathoides
 section Acuminatus (northern Queensland, New Guinea, New Britain, Borneo)
 Podocarpus dispermus
 Podocarpus ledermannii
 Podocarpus micropedunculatus
 section Globulus (Taiwan to Vietnam, Sumatra and Borneo, and New Caledonia)
 Podocarpus annamiensis
 Podocarpus globulus
 Podocarpus lucienii
 Podocarpus nakaii
 Podocarpus sylvestris
 Podocarpus teysmannii
section Longifoliolatus (Sumatra and Borneo, east to Fiji)
 Podocarpus atjehensis
 Podocarpus bracteatus
 Podocarpus confertus
 Podocarpus decumbens
 Podocarpus degeneri
 Podocarpus gibbsii
 Podocarpus longefoliolatus
 Podocarpus polyspermus
 Podocarpus pseudobracteatus
 Podocarpus salomoniensis
section Gracilis (southern China, across Malesia to Fiji)
 Podocarpus affinis
 Podocarpus glaucus
 Podocarpus lophatus
 Podocarpus pilgeri
 Podocarpus rotundus
 section Macrostachyus (Southeast Asia to New Guinea)
 Podocarpus brassii
 Podocarpus brevifolius
 Podocarpus costalis
 Podocarpus crassigemmis
 Podocarpus tixieri
 section Rumphius (Hainan, south through Malesia to northern Queensland)
 Podocarpus grayae (aka P. grayii and P. grayi)
 Podocarpus laubenfelsii
 Podocarpus rumphii
 section Polystachyus (southern China and Japan, through Malaya to New Guinea and northeast Australia)
 Podocarpus chinensis
 Podocarpus chingianus
 Podocarpus elatus
 Podocarpus fasciculus
 Podocarpus macrocarpus
 Podocarpus macrophyllus
 Podocarpus polystachyus
 Podocarpus ridleyi
 Podocarpus subtropicalis
 section Spinulosus (southeast and southwest coasts of Australia)
 Podocarpus drouynianus
 Podocarpus spinulosus

Allergenic potential
Male Podocarpus spp. are extremely allergenic, and have an OPALS allergy-scale rating of 10 out of 10. Conversely, completely female Podocarpus plants have an OPALS rating of 1, and are considered "allergy-fighting", as they capture pollen while producing none.

Podocarpus is related to yews, and as with yews, the stems, leaves, flowers, and pollen of Podocarpus are all poisonous. Additionally, the leaves, stems, bark, and pollen are cytotoxic. The male Podocarpus blooms and releases this cytotoxic pollen in the spring and early summer. Heavy exposure to the pollen, such as with a male Podocarpus planted near a bedroom window, can produce symptoms that mimic the cytotoxic side effects of chemotherapy.

Uses
The earliest use of P. elongatus dates back to the southern African Middle Stone Age where it was used to produce an adhesive by distillation. Today, several species of Podocarpus are grown as garden trees, or trained into hedges, espaliers, or screens. In the novel Jurassic Park by Michael Crichton, Podocarpus trees (misspelled as "protocarpus") were used on Isla Nublar, Costa Rica, to conceal electric fences from visitors.  Common garden species used for their attractive deep-green foliage and neat habits include P. macrophyllus, known commonly as Buddhist pine, fern pine, or kusamaki, P. salignus from Chile, and P. nivalis, a smaller, red-fleshy-coned shrub. Some members of the genera Nageia, Prumnopitys, and Afrocarpus are marketed under the genus name Podocarpus.

The red, purple, or bluish fleshy cone (popularly called a "fruit") of most species of Podocarpus are edible, raw or cooked into jams or pies. They have a mucilaginous texture with a slightly sweet flavor. They are slightly toxic, so should be eaten only in small amounts, especially when raw.

Some species of Podocarpus are used in systems of traditional medicine for conditions such as fevers, coughs, arthritis, sexually transmitted diseases, and canine distemper.

A chemotherapy drug used in treatment of leukemia is made from Podocarpus.

References

Further reading
de Laubenfels, D. J. (1985). A taxonomic revision of the genus Podocarpus. Blumea 30(2), 251-78.
Farjon, A. World Checklist and Bibliography of Conifers 2nd Edition. Kew, Richmond, UK. 2001. 

 
Podocarpaceae genera
Dioecious plants